Sampadananda Mishra (born 17 November 1971) is a Sanskrit scholar from Odisha, specializing in grammar. Mishra was awarded the Maharshi Badrayan Vyas Award for Sanskrit in 2012 by Pratibha Patil, the-then President of India. Mishra was conferred Sahitya Akademi Bala Puraskar 2018 for his book Shanaih Shanaih - A book of Rhyming songs in Sanskrit.

Education
Grandson of a Sanskrit Pandit, Mishra received a post-graduate degree in Sanskrit from Utkal University. He received an MPhil in Sanskrit Grammar from under V. Kutumba Sastry of Pondicherry University and completed his doctorate from Utkal University on Sanskrit and the evolution of human speech.

Career 
From September 1995 to March 2021, Mishra served as the director of Sri Aurobindo Foundation for Indian Culture (SAFIC), Puducherry. At present Mishra works as Dean - Culture and Director of the Centre for Human Sciences at Rishihood University, Sonipat.

Books 
Some of his books are:

 Sampadananda Mishra. Sanskrit and the Evolution of Human Speech. Sri Aurobindo Institute of Research in Social Sciences, 2006. . 171 pp.
 Sampadananda Mishra. Stotravali: A Book of Hymns and Prayers in Sanskrit. Sri Aurobindo Institute of Research in Social Sciences, 2006. . 316 pp.
 Sampadananda Mishra (ed.). The Century of Life of Sri Aurobindo with original verses of Bhartrihari. Sri Aurobindo Institute of Research in Social Sciences, 2005. . 128 pp.
 Sampadananda Mishra. Sri Aurobindo and Sanskrit. Sri Aurobindo Institute of Research in Social Sciences, 2001. . 118 pp.
 Sampadananda Mishra and Vijay Poddar. The wonder that is Sanskrit. Mapin Publishing Gp Pty Ltd, 2001. . 210 pp.
 Sampadananda Mishra. Hasyamanjari: A book of humorous stories in Sanskrit. Sri Aurobindo Institute of Research in Social Sciences, 2001. . 42 pp.
 Sampadananda Mishra. Chandovallari: A handbook of Sanskrit prosody. Sri Aurobindo Institute of Research in Social Sciences, 1999. . 147 pp.
 Sampadananda Mishra. Shanaih Shaniah - A book of Rhyming Songs in Sanskrit, AuroPublications, Sri Aurobindo Society, Pondicherry. . 56pp

Unique initiatives

Divyavani Sanskrit Radio 
In August 2013 Mishra launched the first ever 24/7 Sanskrit Radio called 'Divyavani Sanskrit Radio'.

Samskrita Balasahitya Parishad 
In 2014 Mishra founded Samskrita Balasahitya Parishad for creating, evaluating and propagating qualitative children's literature in Sanskrit.

Vande Mataram Library 
The library plans to publish several volumes of religious and non-religious Sanskrit texts with translations. Mishra floated the idea of an indigenous effort in translating Sanskrit texts, a few days after Hindu Nationalists lodged a petition against the Murty Classical Library of India (MCLI); it was argued that the MCLI works were of a high quality but lacked in cultural understandings. Thus, he co-founded the Vande Mataram Library Trust, an open-source project to translate almost all important scriptures available in Sanskrit.

References

1971 births
Living people
Scholars from Odisha
Indian Sanskrit scholars
Pondicherry University alumni